A total lunar eclipse took place on Saturday, January 9 and Sunday, January 10, 1982, the first of three lunar eclipses in 1982. The Moon was plunged into darkness for 1 hour and 17 minutes 39.5 seconds, in a deep total eclipse which saw the Moon 33.103% of its diameter inside the Earth's umbral shadow. The visual effect of this depends on the state of the Earth's atmosphere, but the Moon may have been stained a deep red colour. The partial eclipse lasted for 3 hours and 24 minutes in total.

Visibility 
It was completely visible over Europe, Africa, Asia and Australia, seen rising over North Atlantic Ocean, and setting over North Pacific Ocean.

Related eclipses

Eclipses in 1982 
 A total lunar eclipse on January 9.
 A partial solar eclipse on January 25.
 A partial solar eclipse on June 21.
 A total lunar eclipse on July 6.
 A partial solar eclipse on July 20.
 A partial solar eclipse on December 15.
 A total lunar eclipse on December 30.
There were seven eclipses in 1982, the maximum possible, including 4 partial solar eclipses: January 25, July 20, June 21, and December 15.

Lunar year series

Tritos 
 Preceded: Lunar eclipse of February 10, 1971
 Followed: Lunar eclipse of December 9, 1992

Tzolkinex 
 Preceded: Lunar eclipse of November 29, 1974
 Followed: Lunar eclipse of March 9, 1988

Half-Saros cycle
A lunar eclipse will be preceded and followed by solar eclipses by 9 years and 5.5 days (a half saros). This lunar eclipse is related to two annular solar eclipses of Solar Saros 131.

See also 
List of lunar eclipses
List of 20th-century lunar eclipses

Notes

External links 
 

1982-01
1982 in science
January 1982 events